Lake Shore & Michigan Southern Freight Depot is a historic freight depot located at Westfield in Chautauqua County, New York. It was constructed in 1904, for the Lake Shore and Michigan Southern Railway.  It is a -story brick structure. It is co-located with the Lake Shore & Michigan Southern Railroad Station.

It was listed on the National Register of Historic Places in 1983.

References

Railway stations in the United States opened in 1904
Transportation buildings and structures in Chautauqua County, New York
Former New York Central Railroad stations
National Register of Historic Places in Chautauqua County, New York
Railway freight houses on the National Register of Historic Places in New York (state)